Novomikhaylovka is a rural locality (a village) in Krivle-Ilyushkinsky Selsoviet, Kuyurgazinsky District, Bashkortostan, Russia. The population was 2 as of 2010. There is 1 street.

Geography 
Novomikhaylovka is located 34 km east of Yermolayevo (the district's administrative centre) by road. Kinzyabayevo is the nearest rural locality.

References 

Rural localities in Kuyurgazinsky District